David Humpherys (born 11 June 1972) is a former professional Magic: The Gathering player from the United States. Humpherys now works for the company that produced Magic, Wizards of the Coast. He was inducted to the Magic: The Gathering Pro Tour Hall of Fame in November 2006.

Accomplishments

Top 8 appearances

Other accomplishments 
 Magic: The Gathering Hall of Fame class of 2006

References 

American Magic: The Gathering players
Living people
1972 births
People from Encinitas, California